Evergestis africalis is a species of moth in the family Crambidae. It is found on Sicily and in Algeria, South Africa and Iran.

The wingspan is about 31 mm. Adults are on wing in October in Algeria.

References

Moths described in 1854
Evergestis
Moths of Europe
Moths of Asia
Moths of Africa